The Mount Victoria Tunnel in the New Zealand capital city of Wellington is 623 metres (slightly more than a third of a mile) long and 5 metres (16.4 ft) in height, connecting Hataitai to the centre of Wellington and the suburb of Mount Victoria, under the mount of the same name. It is part of State Highway 1.

History
The tunnel was built in 15 months by the Hansford and Mills Construction Company. The project cost around £132,000 and greatly reduced travel time between the Eastern Suburbs and the central business district of Wellington.

Construction employed a standard tunnel-excavation technique in which two teams of diggers begin on either side of the obstacle to be tunnelled through, eventually meeting in the centre.

The initial breakthrough, when the two separate teams of diggers met, occurred at 2.30pm on 31 May 1930, and the first people to pass through the breakthrough were tunnellers Philip Gilbert and Alfred Graham. The tunnel was opened officially by the mayor of Wellington, Thomas Hislop, on 12 October 1931.

Although the tunnel has been eclipsed in terms of features and amenities by more recent tunnels around the country, such as the Terrace Motorway Tunnel, the Mount Victoria Tunnel was the first road tunnel in New Zealand to be mechanically ventilated.

There has been a long-standing designation for a second parallel tunnel to the north, in order to relieve peak period congestion resulting from lane merges at both ends of the tunnel.  A pilot tunnel was bored through in 1974 to investigate the technical feasibility and still exists, although the eastern end has been bricked up and the western end lies on private property.  Plans to build the second tunnel paralleled the original plan to complete the Wellington Urban Motorway to the tunnel to provide a motorway bypass of the whole of central Wellington.  The second tunnel component was shelved indefinitely in 1981 when budget cuts meant that a scaled-down motorway extension was proposed that would terminate at the existing tunnel.

Since that date there have been no serious proposals to duplicate the existing tunnel, although cost estimates for such work were at $40 million in the mid-1980s.  Traffic lights have been installed at the end of the city approach to the tunnel to ease congestion and improve safety at the Basin Reserve roundabout.  Mount Victoria Tunnel became part of State Highway 1 in 1997  when Transit New Zealand designated the road from Wellington Airport to the Basin Reserve a State Highway.  The NZ Transport Agency has no plans in the next ten years to duplicate the tunnel, but plans to investigate work to upgrade the city approaches around the Basin Reserve, including a possible flyover to Buckle Street, to reduce congestion at the city end of the tunnel and around the Basin Reserve.  A study is currently underway (The Ngauranga to Airport Study) investigating long-term transport options for the route.  The study indicates that a new tunnel would cost around (NZ)$170 million.

During World War II, the government planned to use the tunnel as an air raid shelter if Wellington were attacked. However, the plan was scrapped, as the tunnel was thought to be too vulnerable to assault from either side by hostile troops.

A well-known local story revolves around a murder that occurred during the construction of the Mount Victoria Tunnel. A young woman named Phyllis Avis Symons (17) was murdered by George Errol Coats (29), who buried her alive in the fill from the tunnel. It is suspected that the girl was pregnant by her lover and the story was later covered in the Wellington newspapers. Upon learning of the murder, police ordered workers to excavate the tunnel's fill in order to find the victim's body..
Phyllis Symons was buried in Karori Cemetery.

Usage
Around 45,000 vehicles pass through the Mount Victoria each day. The tunnel also accommodates pedestrians and cyclists, who use an elevated ramp on the north side of the roadway. In the late 1970s, a number of crime incidents resulted in an alarm system being installed based on buttons spaced along the length of the pedestrian ramp; the system was removed several years later, as it proved ineffective.  Recent additions include new lighting, CCTV cameras, brighter cleanable side panels and pollution control. These have significantly improved safety in the tunnel.

The tunnel currently is a traffic bottleneck in the morning peak from around 7.30 to 9.00am on the Hataitai side with traffic sometimes backing up over 1 km and in the afternoon peak between 5 and 6pm on the city side with queuing back around 0.5 km.  Buses to the eastern suburbs bypass this congestion by using the much-older single-lane Hataitai bus tunnel.

Improvements planned
The NZTA's 2009-2012 National Land Transport Programme indicates the NZTA's funding priorities for state highways and other projects funded from the National Land Transport Account over the next three years.  It has included the following projects for Mount Victoria Tunnel and the approach roads to it:
- NZ$3.7m for design for Mount Victoria Tunnel Safety improvements, as committed funding;
- NZ$2.6m for investigation into improvements on roads around Basin Reserve approaching the tunnel, as committed funding;
- NZ$2.2m for design into improvements on road around Basin Reserve approaching the tunnel, classified as "probable" project to start 2011/12;
- NZ$1.1m for property purchase for potential improvements around Basin Reserve, classified as "probable" project to start 2010/11;
- NZ$40.5m for construction of Mount Victoria Tunnel Safety Improvements, classified as "probable" project to start 2011/12;
- NZ$5.5m for investigation into Mount Victoria Tunnel duplication, classified as "probable" project to start 2011/12.
- NZ$0.1m for investigation into Mount Victoria Tunnel walking/cycling improvements, classified as "Reserve" project, to start 2009/10;
- NZ$0.1m for design into Mount Victoria Tunnel walking/cycling improvements, classified as "Reserve" project, to start 2010/11;
- NZ$1.1m for construction of Mount Victoria Tunnel walking/cycling improvements, classified as "Reserve" project, to start 2011/12.

What this indicates is that the next three years will likely see significant safety improvements made to the tunnel, with some funding on continued investigation, design and property purchases planning for any further upgrades to the tunnel and approach roads beyond that timeframe.

The National Land Transport Programme also forecasts the cost of Basin Reserve improvements to be around NZ$41.2m, but classifies it as a "Reserve" project" with no date for commencement.  It is unlikely construction work on this project, if approved, would commence before 2012.

Second tunnel

Following the opening of the Wellington Airport in 1959 it was identified that due to the additional traffic that this would generate a second tunnel would be needed. However it wasn't until 1974 that a approximately 2.5 metres diameter pilot tunnel was dug through the hill over a 12-month period. The intention was to expand the tunnel out to 10m over the next three years but the plans was cancelled by budget constraints and the entrance was bricked up in 1981. The NZTA still owns 31 properties which were meant to have been used for the tunnel access.

The National Land Transport Programme forecasts costs for duplication of Mount Victoria Tunnel at NZ$6.6m for the design phase and $8.8m for property purchases, but no figure for construction of the tunnel.  The design and property purchase phases are classified as "Reserve" and are unlikely to proceed until completion of the investigation phase.  This means it is almost certain no construction work could commence on duplicating Mount Victoria Tunnel before 2012.  Given the dependency of such a project on improvements at the Basin Reserve, it would be fair to assume that any tunnel duplication is dependent on significant capacity improvements to traffic flow around the Basin Reserve.

Nickname
There is a tradition among Wellingtonians of tooting (sounding) a vehicle's horn as they pass through the tunnel, leading to the local colloquial name of "Toot Tunnel". Some suggest that the tooting began as a tribute to Phyllis Symons, who was buried alive in the spoil from the project by a tunnel labourer, George Coats.

The tradition of tooting in the tunnel was referenced in an episode of the comedy series Wellington Paranormal.

See also
 Terrace Motorway Tunnel

Notes

References
The New Zealand Herald Archives, courtesy of the Central Wellington Library Newspaper Archives.
The Dominion Post Archives, courtesy of the Central Wellington Library Newspaper Archives.
New Zealand Gazette - Te Kahiti o Aotearoa

Road tunnels in New Zealand
Buildings and structures in Wellington City
Transport in Wellington
Tunnels completed in 1931
State Highway 1 (New Zealand)
1930s architecture in New Zealand
Transport buildings and structures in the Wellington Region